is a private university in Hikone, Shiga, Japan. The school was founded in 1985 as a junior college and became a four-year college in 2003.

External links
 Official website 

Educational institutions established in 1985
Christian universities and colleges in Japan
Private universities and colleges in Japan
Universities and colleges in Shiga Prefecture
1985 establishments in Japan
Hikone, Shiga